Odd Sefland (15 May 1935-2004) was a Norwegian politician for the Conservative Party.

He served as a deputy representative to the Norwegian Parliament from Sogn og Fjordane during the term 1977–1981.

References

1935 births
Deputy members of the Storting
Conservative Party (Norway) politicians
Sogn og Fjordane politicians
2004 deaths